The Salamis Stone is a stone carving that contains the various units of measurements used in Ancient Greece. The object currently is housed in the Historical Museum of Piraeus.

History
The Salamis Stone was recognized when it was used as a decoration on a church wall.

Footnotes

Ancient Greek units of measurement
Salamis Island